José Caracci Vignatti (July 23, 1887 – December 11, 1979) was an Italian-born Chilean painter. He won the National Prize of Art of Chile in 1956.

References

1887 births
1979 deaths
People from Frascati
Italian emigrants to Chile
University of Chile alumni
Chilean male painters
19th-century Chilean painters
19th-century Chilean male artists
Chilean male artists
20th-century Chilean painters
Male painters
20th-century Chilean male artists